Darryl Henderson (born 15 July 1958) is  a former Australian rules football, who played with North Melbourne and Sydney in the Victorian Football League (VFL)

Notes

External links 
		

Living people
1958 births
Australian rules footballers from New South Wales
North Melbourne Football Club players
Sydney Swans players
Corowa-Rutherglen Football Club players